Laguna del Barco is a glacial lake in the Sierra de Gredos near the town of El Barco de Ávila, in the province of Ávila, Spain.

It lies in a long glacial valley on the north side of Covacha, one of three such valleys. 
The exit from the natural lake has been dammed to increase its storage capacity.

Shepherds huts along the route provide shelter.
The lake is used as a reservoir, and no camping is allowed in the valley.
The route, which is not difficult, passes through country of great natural beauty.

References
Notes

Citations

Sources

Lakes of Castile and León
Reservoirs in Castile and León
Glacial lakes